WHEA may refer to:

 West Hawai'i Explorations Academy
 Windows Hardware Error Architecture
Women's Hockey East Association, women's league of the Hockey East college ice hockey conference